Lininger is a surname.  It is an Americanized iteration of the German surname Leininger. Notable people with the surname include:

Ann Lininger (born 1968), American politician
George W. Lininger (1834–1907), American art collector
Jack Lininger (1927–2002), American football player

References

German-language surnames
Americanized surnames